The Nigerian Institute of Journalism is a Nigerian monotechnic located at 8-14, Ijaiye road, Ogba in Ikeja, the capital of Lagos State, southwestern Nigeria. The institute is a diploma awarding monotechnic established in 1963  by the International Press Institute and became fully operational in 1971. The institute offers academic and professional diploma programmes, ranging from full time to part time, for the award of National Diploma. The institute has a special programme directorate charged with developing certificate courses in effective writing and communication, photojournalism, film directing and editing. A  standard library, ICT centre, radio and television studios, Photo and digital laboratory facilities amidst others are available to support services. It is one of the monotechnics in Nigeria  which are overseen and accredited by the National Board for Technical Education. The vision of the institute is " to be the leading and foremost Mass Communication and Journalism training Institution in Africa; “the Centre of Communication Excellence.”

Administration
The institute has a governing council chaired by Chief Olusegun Osoba and others members who perform general oversight over the institution and its affairs. The day to day activities of the institution is headed by a provost who serves as the chief academic officer and assisted by a deputy provost as well as the registrar who plays a major role in the review, development, and enforcement of goals and objectives. On September 1, 2020, Mr. Gbenga Adefaye assumed the office of the provost of the institute succeeding Mr. Gbemiga Ogunleye.

Notable alumni
Ayandiji Daniel Aina
Korede Bello
Ngozi Ezeonu
John Momoh
Yeni Kuti
Edward Gabkwet
Abike Dabiri

See also 

 International Press Institute
 Nigerian Guild of Editors
 Nigerian Union of Journalists

References

External links

Penradiolive

Universities and colleges in Nigeria
Organizations based in Lagos
Journalism schools in Nigeria

Education in Nigeria
Education